Ugwueke is a village located in Bende Local Government Area in Abia State, Nigeria.

Demographics
It is occupied by mostly farmers and traders. Some people from other cities visit Ugwueke for business and also to visit the Royal Cross Methodist Hospital.

Constituencies and neighbouring areas
Ugwueke has the following villages surrounding it Igbere, Item, Akoli, Ozuitem, Umuhu, Isuikwuato, Alayi, and Ezeukwu. It has a road that leads from Alayi to Isieke which is the last community in Ugwueke.

Mode of governance

History of government and leaders

References

Populated places in Abia State
Local Government Areas in Abia State